Tripartite motif-containing protein 32 is a protein that in humans is encoded by the TRIM32 gene. Since its discovery in 1995, TRIM32 has been shown to be implicated in a number of diverse biological pathways.

Structure 

The protein encoded by this gene is a member of the tripartite motif (TRIM) family. The TRIM motif includes three zinc-binding domains, a RING, a B-box type 1 and a B-box type 2, and a coiled-coil region.

Subcellular distribution 

The protein localizes to cytoplasmic bodies. The protein has also been localized to the nucleus, where it interacts with the activation domain of the HIV-1 Tat protein. The Tat protein activates transcription of HIV-1 genes.

Interactions 

TRIM32 has been shown to interact with:
 actin,
 ABI2
 c-Myc,
 dysbindin, and
 piasy,

Function

Mechanism 

Currently, TRIM32 is believed to employ two different mechanisms to affect molecular targets. First, it can act through its N-terminal RING finger as an E3 ubiquitin ligase, responsible for attaching ubiquitin molecules to lysine residues of target proteins, in order to mark them for proteosome degradation. Currently evidence suggests TRIM32 ubiquitinates multiple proteins including c-Myc, dysbindin, actin, piasy, and Abl-interactor2 (ABI2).  The second mechanism by which TRIM32 is believed to operate involves binding of proteins to the C-terminal NHL repeat, which has been shown to activate miRNAs.

Development 

Research has recently shown the importance of TRIM32 in the development of the mouse neocortex. In the mouse neocortex, neural progenitor cells generate daughter cells which either differentiate into specific neurons or maintain the progenitor state of the mother cell. TRIM32 helps control the balance between differentiating and progenitor cells by localizing to a pole during progenitor cell division, and thus becoming concentrated in one of the two daughter cells. This asymmetric division of TRIM32 induces neuronal differentiation in daughter cells which contain high TRIM32 concentrations, while cells with low TRIM32 concentrations retain progenitor cell fate. Proposed theories on how TRIM32 induces differentiation involve the ubiquitination of the transcription factor c-Myc and the binding of Argonaute-1 (Ago-1). The binding of Ago-1 induces activity of miRNAs, particularly Let-7a, which has been shown to play a role in regulating proliferation and neuronal differentiation.

Skeletal muscle 

TRIM32 is expressed in skeletal muscle, where it interacts with myosin and may ubiquitinate actin (it has been shown to do so in vitro). No difference has been observed between wild-type and LHMD2H-mutated TRIM32 in terms of actin or myosin binding, however, and thus the mechanism which causes the muscular dystrophy, LGMD2H, is still unknown. Additionally, TRIM32 is known to ubiquitinate dysbindin, a protein associated with both skeletal muscles and neural tissue. The purpose and effects of the ubiquitination of dysbindin are as yet unclear.

Clinical significance

Mutation-associated diseases 

Bardet–Biedl syndrome (BBS): TRIM32 is one of 14 
genes known to be linked with BBS. Specifically a mutation (P130S) in the B-box of TRIM32 gives rise to BBS.

Limb-girdle muscular dystrophy type2H (LGMD2H): LGMD2H is caused by 4 mutations of TRIM32 in the C-terminal NHL domain: D487N (third NHL repeat), R394H (first NHL repeat), T520TfsX13 (fourth NHL repeat), and D588del (fifth NHL repeat).

Cancer 

TRIM32 is overexpressed in skin cancer cells. It is thought that TRIM32 regulates NF-κB activity through ubiquitination of Protein Inhibitor of Activated STAT Y (Piasy). Piasy acts as an inhibitor of NF-κB, and NF-κB acts as an anti-apoptotic factor. Thus, when Piasy is present, NF-κB is inhibited, and keratinocytes undergo apoptosis when exposed to ultraviolet-B radiation or TNFα, preventing cancer formation. When TRIM32 is overexpressed, Piasy is degraded, allowing NF-κB to function, and thus when cells are exposed to ultraviolet-B radiation or TNFα, apoptosis does not occur, potentially allowing cancer formation.

TRIM32 additionally promotes cancer formation by ubiquitinating Abl-interactor 2 (Abi2), which is a tumor suppressor and inhibitor of cell migration.

See also 
 tripartite motif family

References

External links
  GeneReviews/NIH/NCBI/UW entry on Bardet-Biedl Syndrome

Further reading